Krivosheinskaya is a rural locality (a village) in Spasskoye Rural Settlement, Tarnogsky District, Vologda Oblast, Russia. The population was 13 as of 2002.

Geography 
Krivosheinskaya is located 27 km northwest of Tarnogsky Gorodok (the district's administrative centre) by road. Denisovskaya is the nearest rural locality.

References 

Rural localities in Tarnogsky District